Sanjeeda Sheikh  (born 20 December 1984) is an Indian actress who works in the Hindi television industry. She is one of the most famous actresses on Indian television.

Early life
She was born in Kuwait into a religious Muslim family who hail from Ahmedabad, Gujarat.

Personal life 

On 2 March 2012, she married her longtime boyfriend Aamir Ali. In August 2020, it was revealed that the couple has a one-year old daughter, Ayra Ali, through surrogacy.

They later separated in 2020 after 8 years of marriage and were granted divorce in 2021 with Sheikh getting their daughter's custody. 

Reportedly She is currently Dating Her Taish Co-Star Harshvardhan Rane.

On 29 May 2017, Sheikh's sister-in-law Zakerabanu Zakir Hussain Bagban filed a domestic violence case against her, her brother Anas Abdul Rahim Sheikh and their mother, Anisha Sheikh. Zakerabanu alleges that she was speaking with her father over the phone on 27 May when the trio started yelling at her and beating her up, saying that they did not want her in their Mumbai home anymore. Sheikh's family filed a petition against the FIR in the Ahmedabad High Court. The petition stated that Sheikh had been busy shooting on the day of the incident. On 30 August, Sanjeeda Sheikh was granted interim relief in the case as the Ahmedabad High Court waived the service of the notice.

Career 
Sanjeeda has played various roles on television soap operas. She made her acting debut as Nimmo in the 2005 TV series Kyaa Hoga Nimmo Kaa.  After that, she appeared as a vamp  in the 2007 Star Plus series Kayamath. In the same year, she participated in a dancing competition show named Nach Baliye 3, with husband Aamir Ali, the couple won the competition.

In 2008, she appeared in the serial Kya Dill Main Hai opposite Aamir Ali which was telecasted on 9X channel. 
  
In 2014, Sheikh appeared as Durga Thakur, an ambitious and confident young woman, who is seeking justice for her sister, in Ek Hasina Thi. The serial was the breakthrough of her career as her performance was acclaimed by critics and viewers and it was one of the most successful shows of Star Plus at that time.

In 2016, she appeared as Dhani in Ishq Ka Rang Safed which was the first time Sheikh played an onscreen mother, of a 5-year-old child.

In March 2017 Sheikh appeared as Renya in a supernatural web series, titled Gehraiyaan, opposite her Ek Hasina Thi co-star Vatsal Sheth. The web series is directed by debutante director Sidhant Sachdev and produced by the Vikram Bhatt production house. In 2017, Sheikh appeared as Kamini Mathur, a superstar, in a tv series titled Love Ka Hai Intezaar, opposite Keith Sequeira aired by Star Plus. The show was earlier titled as Kya Tu Meri Lage.

Filmography

Films

Television

Web series

Music videos

Awards and nominations

See also 

 
 List of Indian television actresses
 List of Indian film actresses

References

External links 

 
 
 

Living people
People from Kuwait City
21st-century Indian actresses
Indian television actresses
Indian female dancers
Indian women television presenters
Indian television presenters
Actresses in Hindi cinema
Gujarati people
Nach Baliye winners
1984 births
Indian soap opera actresses
Actors from Mumbai
Indian female models